The 1955 SMU Mustangs football team represented Southern Methodist University (SMU) as a member of the Southwest Conference (SWC) during the 1955 college football season. Led by third-year head coach Woody Woodard, the Mustangs compiled an overall record of 4–6 with a mark of 2–4 in conference play, tying for fifth place in the SWC. SMU played home games at the Cotton Bowl in Dallas. Forrest Gregg and David Hawk were the team captains.

Schedule

References

SMU
SMU Mustangs football seasons
SMU Mustangs football